Virginia Ruth Young is the Cecil J. and Ethel M. Nesbitt Professor of Actuarial Mathematics at the University of Michigan, and an expert on the mathematics of insurance.

Education and career
Young graduated from Cumberland College in 1981, and completed a PhD in mathematics, specializing in algebraic topology, at the University of Virginia in 1984. Her dissertation, Branched coverings arising from group actions, was supervised by Robert Evert Stong. After postdoctoral research at the Institute for Advanced Study, she returned to Cumberland as a faculty member from 1986 to 1990. However, after earning tenure at Cumberland, she left academia and began working as an actuary, becoming a Fellow of the Society of Actuaries in 1992. She rejoined academia as an assistant professor of business at the University of Wisconsin–Madison in 1993, and moved to Michigan as the inaugural Nesbitt Professor in 2003.

Contributions
Young won the 1997 Halmstad Prize and 1998 Edward A. Lew Award of the Society of Actuaries for her work with Frees, King, Rosenberg, and Lai on mathematical models for the long-term behavior of the US Social Security system. Other topics in her research have included comparisons of least squares versus entropy-based methods for actuarial prediction, and the applications of stochastic control to portfolio optimization problems involving insurance policies.

References

External links
Home page

Year of birth missing (living people)
Living people
20th-century American mathematicians
21st-century American mathematicians
American women mathematicians
American actuaries
University of the Cumberlands alumni
University of Wisconsin–Madison faculty
University of Michigan faculty
20th-century women mathematicians
21st-century women mathematicians
20th-century American women
21st-century American women